Minhocão may mean:
Minhocão (legendary creature) - an earthworm or fish-like creature of Brazilian folklore
Minhocão (São Paulo) - officially the Elevado Presidente Costa e Silva, a road